Ty Simpson is an American football quarterback for the Alabama Crimson Tide.

Early life and high school
Simpson grew up in Martin, Tennessee and attended Westview High School. He passed for 1,888 yards and 20 touchdowns while also rushing for 311 yards and seven touchdowns as a junior. Simpson was named the Tennessee Gatorade Player of the Year after passing for 2,827 yards and 41 touchdowns against three interceptions while rushing 92 times for 862 yards and 11 touchdowns as Westview won the 2A Tennessee State Championship. He was rated a five-star recruit and committed to play college football at Alabama after considering offers from Clemson, Ole Miss, and Tennessee.

College career
Simpson joined the Alabama Crimson Tide as an early enrollee in January 2022. He made his college debut in the season opener against Utah State, completing one of two pass attempts towards the end of a 55-0 win. Simpson played in four games during his true freshman year while redshirting the season.

Personal life
Simpson's father, Jason Simpson, is the head football coach for the UT Martin Skyhawks.

References

External links
Alabama Crimson Tide profile

Living people
Players of American football from Tennessee
American football quarterbacks
Alabama Crimson Tide football players
Year of birth missing (living people)